Peru competed at the 1948 Summer Olympics in London, England. 41 competitors, all men, took part in 26 events in 7 sports.

Medalists

Gold
 Edwin Vásquez — Shooting, Men's free pistol

Athletics

Men
Track and road events

Field events

Basketball

Men's Team Competition

Preliminary Round (Group C)

Classification Matches

Team Roster

Guillermo Ahrens Valdivia
Carlos Alegre Benavides
David Descalzo Álvarez
Virgilio Drago Burga
Alberto Fernández Calderón
Arturo Ferreyros Pérez
Eduardo Fiestas Arce
Rodolfo Salas Crespo
Luis Sánchez Maquiavelo
R. Ríos Soracco
José Vizcarra Nieto

Boxing

Cycling

Road
Men

Fencing

Three fencers, all men, represented Peru in 1948.

Men's foil
 Hugo Higueras

Men's épée
 Carlos Iturri

Men's sabre
 Jorge Sarria

Shooting

Nine shooters represented Peru in 1948.

Pistol

Rifle

Weightlifting

Men

References

External links
Official Olympic Reports
International Olympic Committee results database

Nations at the 1948 Summer Olympics
1948
1948 in Peruvian sport